Turkey breeds are reported to the DAD-IS breed database of the Food and Agriculture Organization of the United Nations by more than sixty countries. The breeds reported include commercial/industrial strains, local types and recognised breeds in many countries.

United States 

Twenty breeds are reported to DAD-IS by the United States. Eight of them are recognised by the American Poultry Association in its breed standard, the American Standard of Perfection, where however they are classified as "varieties" rather than as breeds. This may be because the original genotype for domestic turkeys was for Bronze, and all other color varieties are due to mutations from it.

APA varieties

Europe 

Twelve breeds are recognized by the Entente Européenne d'Aviculture et de Cuniculture. Others with breed standards of European national associations are accepted.

EE breeds 

Other varieties not recognized by the APA or EE include the following: 

 Auburn or Light Brown is an extremely rare as its numbers are not considered high enough for inclusion in the Standard. An extremely rare variant of the Auburn is called the Silver Auburn.
 Buff (or Jersey Buff) is a very rare heritage breed.  
 Chocolate breed is chocolate brown in color. Day-old poults are white-faced with chocolate bodies.
 Midget White is a rare heritage breed sometimes confused with the Beltsville Small White.
 Zagorje (Zagorski puran) is a Croatian variant of turkey.

See also
 Turkey genus
 Wild turkey of North America
 Domestic turkey
 Ocellated turkey, a species of turkey residing primarily in the Yucatán Peninsula in Mexico.

References 

 

Lists of birds
 List of
Lists of breeds